

France
French India - Joseph Beauvollier de Courchant, Governor (1723-1726)
New France -

Great Britain
Bermuda -
Connecticut – Joseph Talcott, Governor of Connecticut (1724–1741)
Madras Presidency - Nathaniel Elwick, 1721-1725
Massachusetts -
New York -
Pennsylvania -
Virginia -

Netherlands
 Delagoa Bay – Jan van de Cappelle, Opperhofd (1724–1726)
 Dutch Ceylon - 
Johannes Hertenberg (1723-1725)
Joan Paul Schaghen, acting governor (1725-1726)
 Dutch East Indies - Hendrick Zwaardecroon

Oman
 Mombasa – Nasr ibn Abdallah al-Mazru‘i, Wali of Mombasa (1698–1728)

Portugal
 Angola – 
 António de Albuquerque Coelho de Carvalho, Governor of Angola (1722–1725)
 José Carvalho da Costa, Governor of Angola (1725–1726)
 Macau – Antonio Carneiro de Alcacova, Governor of Macau (1724–1727)

Spain 
 Governorate of Paraguay - José de Antequera y Castro, Governor of Paraguay (1721-1725)

Colonial governors
Colonial governors
1725